Naengguk or chilled soup refers to all kinds of cold guk (soups) in Korean cuisine, mainly eaten in summer. It is also called chan'guk, which literally means "cold soup" in pure Korean, while the term naengguk is a combination of a hanja word ("cold") and a pure Korean word ("soup").

The first historical record on naengguk appears in a poem written by Yi Gyu-bo (1168–1241), a high officer of the Goryeo period (918–1392). In the poem, naengguk is referred to as sungaeng, which literally means sunchaeguk, i.e., soup made with sunchae (Brasenia schreberi). Yi praised its clear and plain taste, saying it made usual dishes seem vulgar.

Naengguk is largely divided into two categories according to seasoning and ingredients. The first category is made by mixing chilled water and vinegar to give a sour and sweet taste, such as miyeok naengguk made with wakame, oi naengguk made with cucumber, pa naengguk made with spring onions, maneul naengguk made with garlic, and gim naengguk made with gim or nori. The other category is made to supplement health and has rich tastes such as chilled soup made with chicken, sesame, or soybeans.

See also
Jjigae
Jeongol
List of Korean dishes
 List of soups

References

External links

Soups and stews from Food in Korea

 
Cold soups